OLP Guitars was a guitar building company that marketed licensed replicas of famous models by other makers. The company's name stands for "Officially Licensed Product". OLP worked with Music Man and other companies. OLP was a subsidiary of Hanser Holdings International.

The instruments were manufactured in China, with good quality control, and higher quality electronics and hardware sourced from Korea, intending to make desirable instruments available at an affordable price. 

The licensed OLP versions of the Ernie Ball Music Man four- and five-string basses were quite popular. The OLP MM1FR model is a version of the Music Man Axis model. Versions of Los Angeles luthier Stephen McSwain's artistic guitars [the Tin Top/Machine and Anarchy models] were produced. Also offered were a John Petrucci OLP guitar and an Orange County Choppers model, as well as a Tony Levin Signature MM StingRay model.  

The disappearance of Hanser Holdings International's OLP guitar line was prior to Music Man's working with Praxis Musical on the "Sterling by Music Man" line, which began in 2009.

References

External links
 http://www.myspace.com/olpguitars
 http://www.sterlingbymusicman.com/

Guitar manufacturing companies of the United States